= Parque Metropolitano de Guadalajara =

Park in Zapopan, Jalisco, Mexico

- Location within Mexico
- Location: Zapopan, Jalisco, Mexico
- Coordinates: 20°40′12″N 103°26′24″W

Parque Metropolitano de Guadalajara is a public park in Zapopan, in the Mexican state of Jalisco. It holds many events, like concerts, public screening of movies, and food festivals. It has a space for soccer (MetroGol) and a special area for dogs (MetroCan).
